Dermot Hurley (born 1980) is an Irish retired Gaelic footballer who played for club side Castlehaven and at inter-county level with the Cork senior football team. He usually lined out as a midfielder.

Career

Collins first came to Gaelic football prominence with the Castlehaven team that won the County Under-21 CHampionship title in 1998. He subsequently progressed onto the club's senior team and added a senior medal to his collection in 2003 before similar successes in 2012 and 2013. Hurley also lined out in the minor grade with Cork, and was drafted onto the Cork senior team in 2004. His brief inter-county career saw him claim a Munster Football Championship medal, while he was also a substitute when Cork were beaten by Kerry in the 2007 All-Ireland final.

Honours

Castlehaven
Cork Senior Football Championship: 2003, 2012, 2013
Cork Under-21 Football Championship: 1998

Cork
Munster Senior Football Championship: 2006

References

1980 births
Living people
Castlehaven Gaelic footballers
Cork inter-county Gaelic footballers